Achille in Sciro is an opera seria by composer Domenico Sarro. The opera uses an Italian language libretto by Pietro Metastasio. It was commissioned for the opening of the Teatro di San Carlo by King Charles VII of Naples, later known as Charles III of Spain. The work premiered at the inauguration of the theatre on 4 November 1737, Charles's name day. It is based on the story of Achilles on Skyros.

The opera was not performed for more than 250 years until it was revived at the Festival della Valle d'Itria in 2007. That performance was recorded live and released on CD by Dynamic Records in 2008. The cast was as follows:

Achille: Gabriella Martellacci
Lycomedes: Marcello Nardis
Teagene: Massimiliano Arizzi
Deidamia: Maria Laura Martorana
Ulysses: Francisco Ruben Brito
Nearco: Eufemia Tufano
Arcade: Dolores Carlucci
Orchestra Internazionale d’Italia
Bratislava Chamber Choir
Conductor: Federico Maria Sardelli
Director: Davide Livermore

Metastasio's libretto Achille in Sciro was first set by Antonio Caldara (1736, Vienna).

Recordings
Federico Maria Sardelli Dynamic 3CD

References

1737 operas
1749 operas
Operas
Italian-language operas
Operas by Domenico Sarro
Opera world premieres at the Teatro San Carlo